Motivic integration is a notion in algebraic geometry that was introduced by Maxim Kontsevich in 1995 and was developed by Jan Denef and François Loeser. Since its introduction it has proved to be quite useful in various branches of  algebraic geometry, most notably birational geometry and singularity theory. Roughly speaking, motivic integration assigns to subsets of the arc space of an algebraic variety, a volume living in the  Grothendieck ring of  algebraic varieties. The naming 'motivic' mirrors the fact that unlike ordinary integration, for which the values are real numbers, in motivic integration the values are geometric in nature.

References

External links 
AMS Bulletin Vol. 42 Tom Hales
 What is motivic measure?
Lecture Notes (2019) Devlin Mallory
Motivic Integration
 math.AG/9911179 A.Craw 
An introduction to motivic integration
Lecture Notes (version of 2008) François Loeser
 Seattle lecture notes on motivic integration 
Lecture Notes W.Veys
Arc spaces, motivic integration and stringy invariants

Algebraic geometry
Definitions of mathematical integration